The Human Interference Task Force was a team of engineers, anthropologists, nuclear physicists, behavioral scientists and others convened on behalf of the U.S. Department of Energy and Bechtel Corp. to find a way to reduce the likelihood of future humans unintentionally intruding on radioactive waste isolation systems.

See also
Hazard symbol
Long-term nuclear waste warning messages

References

Further reading

 Roland Posner (Hg.): Warnungen an die ferne Zukunft – Atommüll als Kommunikationsproblem. Raben-Verlag, München, 
 J. Kreusch und H. Hirsch: Sicherheitsprobleme der Endlagerung radioaktiver Abfälle in Salz. Gruppe Ökologie, Hannover 1984
 Umberto Eco: The search for the perfect language, Wiley-Blackwell, 1995, pages 176–177.  . The Search for the Perfect Language 
 Vincent Ialenti: Deep Time Reckoning , The MIT Press, 2020, . Deep Time Reckoning: How Future Thinking Can Help Earth Now 
 Thomas A. Sebeok; Communication Measures to Bridge Ten Millennia (Columbus, Ohio: Battelle Memorial Institute, Office of Nuclear Waste Isolation, 1984)
 Sebastian Musch: "The Atomic Priesthood and Nuclear Waste Management - Religion, Sci-fi Literature and the End of our Civilization". Zygon. Journal of Religion and Science, Volume 51, Issue 3, p. 626–639.

 Sebastian Musch: "Hans Jonas, Günther Anders, and the Atomic Priesthood: An Exploration into Ethics, Religion and Technology in the Nuclear Age". Religions 2021, Volume 12, Issue 9. Hans Jonas, Günther Anders, and the Atomic Priesthood: An Exploration into Ethics, Religion and Technology in the Nuclear Age

External links
 Spiegelfeuer (Der Spiegel)
 TU Cottbus - Wissen für die Zukunft (PDF, 527 kB)
 Pandora's Box: How and Why to Communicate 10,000 Years into the Future (Th. A. Sebeok)
 The Trouble with Pictures, first chapter from John Mans "Alpha Beta" (pdf, 105 kB)
 Human Interference Task Force Reducing the Likelihood of Future Human Activities That Could Affect Geologic High-level Waste Repositories. Technical Report, Office of Nuclear Waste Isolation, 1984.
 excerpt from "Deep Time"  by Gregory Benford
 Signs of Danger: Waste, Trauma and Nuclear Threat (Peter C. van Wyck) 
 "Ten Thousand Years", by Roman Mars, 99% Invisible
  Sebastian Musch: The Atomic Priesthood and Nuclear Waste Management - Religion, Sci-fi Literature and the End of our Civilization
 Sebastian Musch: Hans Jonas, Günther Anders, and the Atomic Priesthood: An Exploration into Ethics, Religion and Technology in the Nuclear Age
Semiotics
Radioactive waste